Mosciano Sant'Angelo (Moscianese:) is a town and comune of the province of Teramo in the Abruzzo region of eastern Italy.

Nearby communes include Bellante, Castellalto, Giulianova, Notaresco, Roseto degli Abruzzi, Sant'Omero, Tortoreto .

Festivals
In July the town holds a jazz festival.

People
Aurelio Saliceti -politician

References

External links
Site on art and history at Mosciano 

Cities and towns in Abruzzo